Xhezair Teliti (born 17 February 1948, in Kavajë) is a professor of mathematics and has served as chief of the Department of Mathematics at Tirana University since 2008. He was Albania's Minister of Education from 1993-1996.

Career
His field of study is Functional Analysis and Theory of Mass and Integration. Teliti is author of many text-books:

 "Teoria e Funksioneve te Variablit Real, I, II(Theory of Functions of Real Variable)", 1980, Tirana;    
  "Përgjithësimi i Konceptit të Integrali(Generalization of the Concept of Integral)", 1981;    
  "Teoria Konstruktive e Funksioneve(The Constructive Theory of Functions)", P. Pilika, Xh. Teliti – 1984;    
  "Përmbledhje Problemash në Analizën Funksional(Summary of Problems for Functional Analysis)", 1989, Tirana;    
  "Probleme dhe Ushtrime të Analizës Matematike (Problems and Exercises of Mathematical Analysis", 1997, Tirana;    
  "Teoria e Masës dhe e Integrimit(Theory of Mass and Integration)", 1997, Tirana;    
  "Problema në Teorinë e Masës e të Integrimit(Problems for the Theory of Mass and Integration)", 1998, Tirana;    
  "Topologjia e Përgjithshme dhe Analiza Funksionale(General Topology and Funbctional Analysis)", 2002, Tirana;    
  "Elemente Strukturorë dhe Topologjikë në Hapësirat R dhe R (n) (Topological and Structural Elements in R and R (n) spaces", 2008, Tirana.

Prof. Teliti has also written many articles in the Bulletin of Natural Sciences at the University.

References

Cabinet ministers from Kavajë
1948 births
Living people
Albanian mathematicians
Academic staff of the University of Tirana
Government ministers of Albania
Education ministers of Albania